Gaylussacia frondosa is a species of flowering plant in the heath family known by the common names dangleberry and blue huckleberry. It is native to the eastern United States, where it occurs from New Hampshire to South Carolina.

This shrub grows up to two meters (80 inches) tall. The plant spreads via rhizome, sprouting up new stems to form colonies. The leaves are up to 6 centimeters (2.4 inches) long by 3 cm (1.2 inches) wide. They are hairy and glandular. The inflorescence contains 1 to 4 flowers that hang on pedicels up to 2 centimeters (0.8 inch) long. The flower is bell-shaped and greenish white. The fruit is a juicy, sweet-tasting drupe which is usually blue but may be black or white.

This plant grows on the Atlantic coastal plain. It grows in wooded areas and next to bogs and swamps. It is common in the pine barrens of New Jersey. It grows on acidic soils low in nutrients. It grows with other related plants such as highbush blueberry (Vaccinium corymbosum), hillside blueberry (V. pallidum), Lyonia spp., sheep-laurel (Kalmia angustifolia), wintergreen (Gaultheria procumbens), dwarf huckleberry (Gaylussacia dumosa), and black huckleberry (G. baccata).

Many animals eat the berries and disperse the seeds.

Taxonomy
Gaylussacia frondosa was once more widely circumscribed, encompassing three varieties; however, G. frondosa var. nana and G. frondosa var. tomentosa are now widely recognized at species level, as Gaylussacia nana and Gaylussacia tomentosa.

References

External links
The Nature Conservancy
Trees, Shrubs, and Woody Vines of North Carolina

frondosa
Flora of the Northeastern United States
Flora of the Southeastern United States
Berries
Plants described in 1753
Taxa named by Carl Linnaeus
Taxa named by Asa Gray
Taxa named by John Torrey